John Rand may refer to:
 John L. Rand, 1861–1942, American politician and jurist 
 John Goffe Rand 1801–1873, portrait painter and inventor
 John Rand (actor) (1871–1940), American actor who notably supported Charles Chaplin